This Thing Called Love is the title of the following movies:

This Thing Called Love (1929 film), a romantic comedy starring Edmund Lowe and Constance Bennett; considered a lost film
This Thing Called Love (1940 film), featuring Rosalind Russell and Melvyn Douglas; like the 1929 film, it was based on the play of the same name
Hun yin wu yu, also known as This Thing Called Love, a 1991 Hong Kong movie directed by Chi-Ngai Lee and starring Ying Sau Hui, Rosamund Kwan and Tony Leung Ka Fai
"This Thing Called Love", song by Livin Out Loud.

Music:

 This Thing Called Love: The Greatest Hits of Alexander O'Neal, a 1992 album by Alexander O'Neal
 This Thing Called Love (album), a 1959 album by American singer Tommy Sands